América Managua is a Nicaraguan football team who last played at the local top level in the 2010/2011 season.

History
It is based in Managua, and has been for long time the most successful team of the capital city and the one with the most fanatics in the area.

They won their first league title in 1985 coached by Florencio Leiva, after just being promoted. It was the first time a newly promoted side won the Nicaraguan league title. They played in the second division for several years and almost disappeared due to bankruptcy.
At the end of the 2004–2005 season, Deportivo América won promotion to the top division after beating Scorpión FC in the Second Division championship final.

In May 2011 the club decided not to show up for a replay against Real Madriz risking the chance of being expelled from Nicaraguan football. The replay was ordered by FENIFUT after Xilotepelt accused América chairman Eliécer Trillos of bribing the Madriz team who lost the game 1–7 to save América from relegation and sent Xilotepelt down on goal difference.

Achievements
Primera División de Nicaragua: 3
1985, 1988, 1990

List of Managers

  José Antonio Pipa Cordero (1942-1946) 
  Salvador Dubois Leiva
  Florencio Leiva (1985–1990, 2006)
  Eduardo "Quito" López (July 2006 – 2006)
  Glen Blanco (2007)
  Edison Oquendo (2008)
  Miguel Artola (2008)
  Martín Mena (2010–2011)

References

Football clubs in Nicaragua